Joan Waugh is an American historian and academic on the faculty at University of California, Los Angeles. She specializes in 19th-century American history and is an expert on the American Civil War, the aftermath, and the Gilded Age.

Life 
Waugh graduated from UCLA.

She has written books such as U.S. Grant: American Hero, American Myth, Unsentimental Reformer: The Life of Josephine Shaw Lowell (1998), The Memory of the Civil War in American Culture (2004), and The American War: A History of the Civil War Era (2015), co-authored with Gary W. Gallagher. 
Waugh has also written essays on Civil War topics, including Ulysses Grant, on whom she has commented critically.

Waugh has given numerous lectures at universities, and along with Gallagher, she has been involved in conferences on the Civil War at the Huntington Library.

References

External links

Joan Waugh Smith Lecture in Civil War History, September 28, 2017
 IMDB entry

21st-century American historians
University of California, Los Angeles faculty
Living people
21st-century American women writers
American women historians
Year of birth missing (living people)
Historians from California